Stênio Garcia Faro (born 28 April 1932) is a Brazilian actor.

Television 
 1966 - As Minas de Prata .... José
 1967 - Os Fantoches .... Torquato
 1968 - A Muralha .... Aimbé
 1968 - O Terceiro Pecado .... Tomás
 1969 - Dez Vidas .... Silvério dos Reis
 1969 - Os estranhos .... Daniel
 1971 - Hospital .... Maurício
 1972 - Na Idade do Lobo .... Chico
 1973 - Cavalo de Aço.... Brucutu
 1973 - O Semideus.... Lorde José
 1975 - Gabriela.... Felismino
 1976 - Saramandaia .... Geraldo
 1979 - Carga Pesada (seriado) .... Bino
 1981 - O Amor é Nosso .... Leonardo
 1981 - Terras do Sem Fim .... Amarelo Joaquim
 1982 - Final Feliz .... Mestre Antônio
 1983 - Bandidos da Falange (minissérie) .... Lucena
 1984 - Corpo a Corpo .... Amauri Pelegrini
 1984 - Padre Cícero .... Padre Cícero
 1986 - Hipertensão .... Chico
 1986 - Selva de Pedra .... Pedro
 1988 - O Pagador de Promessas .... Dedé
 1989 - O Sexo dos Anjos .... padre Aurélio
 1989 - Que Rei Sou Eu? .... Corcoran
 1990 - Rainha da Sucata .... Sérgio
 1990 - Boca do Lixo .... Ciro
 1990 - Meu Bem, Meu Mal .... Argemiro
 1991 - O Dono do Mundo.... Herculano Maciel
 1992 - De Corpo e Alma .... Domingos Bianchi
 1993 - O Mapa da Mina .... Pedro Cunha
 1993 - Agosto .... Ramos
 1993 - Olho no Olho .... Armando
 1994 - A Madona de Cedro (minissérie) .... padre Estêvão
 1994 - Tropicaliente .... Samuel
 1995 - Engraçadinha... seus amores e seus pecados .... Carlinhos
 1995 - Decadência .... Tavares Branco Filho
 1995 - Explode Coração .... Pepe
 1996 - O Rei do Gado .... Zé do Araguaia
 1998 - Hilda Furacão (minissérie) .... Tonico Mendes
 1998 - Labirinto .... Jonas
 1998 - Torre de Babel .... Bruno Maia
 2000 - A Muralha .... Caraíba
 2001 - A Padroeira .... Antônio Cabral
 2001 - O Clone .... Tio Ali 
 2001 - Os Maias .... Manuel Monforte
 2002 - Pastores da Noite .... Chalub 
 2003 - Kubanacan .... Rubio Montenegro
 2003/2007 - Carga Pesada (seriado) .... Bino
 2005 - Hoje é dia de Maria (microssérie) .... Asmodeu
 2005 - Hoje é dia de Maria - Segunda Jornada .... Asmodeu
 2006 - O Profeta .... Jacó de Oliveira
 2007 - Duas Caras.... Barreto (Paulo de Queirós Barreto)
 2008 - Ó Paí, Ó .... Seu Jerônimo
 2009 - Caminho das Índias .... Dr. Castanho
 2010 - Malhação .... Prof. Ramon (participação especial)
 2011 - Batendo Ponto .... Nestor
 2011 - A Vida da Gente .... Laudelino
 2012 - Salve Jorge .... Artur

Cinema 
 1964 - O vigilante contra o crime
 1964 - Vereda de salvação
 1967 - Vigilante em missão secreta
 1968 - As amorosas
 1969 - A mulher de todos
 1970 - A guerra dos pelados
 1970 - O pornógrafo
 1973 - Em compasso de espera
 1975 - Ana, a libertina
 1976 - O esquadrão da morte
 1977 - As três mortes de Solano
 1977 - Morte e vida severina
 1977 - O crime do Zé Bigorna
 1978 - Tudo bem
 1987 - Leila Diniz
 1989 - Kuarup
 1989 - Solidão, Uma Linda História de Amor
 1990 - Mais que a terra
 1991 - Brincando nos campos do Senhor
 1997 - Os matadores
 1998 - Hans Staden
 1998 - O menino maluquinho 2 - A aventura
 2000 - Eu, tu, eles
 2000 - O circo das qualidades humanas
 2004 - Redentor
 2005 - Casa de areia
 2005 - O beijo no asfalto
 2007 - Ó Paí, Ó
 2012 - O Inventor de Sonhos

References

External links
 

1932 births
Living people
People from Espírito Santo
Brazilian male television actors
Brazilian male telenovela actors
Brazilian male film actors